Patrick J. McManus (July 20, 1954 – July 10, 2009) was a Massachusetts attorney and politician who served as the 54th Mayor of Lynn, Massachusetts.

Early life
McManus was born in Lynn to Robert A. McManus and Kathryn "Kay" (Gainey) McManus.

Member of the Lynn City Council
In 1985 McManus was elected to the first of three terms  on the Lynn City Council.

In 1990, McManus was a finalist for the Town Manager's position in Saugus, Massachusetts. The job went to Massachusetts Department of Revenue Deputy Commissioner Edward J. Collins Jr.

Mayor of Lynn
In 1991 McManus was elected Mayor by 3,708 votes over incumbent mayor Albert V. DiVirgilio, McManus received 13,601 votes, to DiVirgilio's 9,893.  McManus served as mayor from 1992 to 2002.

2009 election and death
On June 9, 2009, McManus formally announced that he would run against incumbent Mayor Edward J. Clancy Jr. in that year's election. On July 10, 2009, McManus was found dead in his home.

Notes

Mayors of Lynn, Massachusetts
Massachusetts city council members
1954 births
2009 deaths
20th-century American politicians